Ranjeet Suman is an Indian politician and a member of the Sixteenth Legislative Assembly of Uttar Pradesh in India. He represents the Jalesar constituency of Uttar Pradesh and is a member of the Samajwadi Party political party. Suman belongs to the scheduled caste community.

Early life and  education
Ranjeet Suman was born in Hathras district. He attended the Dr. Bhimrao Ambedkar University and attained Master of Arts & Bachelor of Laws degrees.

Political career
Ranjeet Suman has been a MLA for one term. He represented the Jalesar constituency and is a member of the Samajwadi Party political party.

Posts held

See also

 Jalesar (Assembly constituency)
 Sixteenth Legislative Assembly of Uttar Pradesh
 Uttar Pradesh Legislative Assembly

References 

Samajwadi Party politicians
Uttar Pradesh MLAs 2012–2017
People from Agra district
1976 births
Living people